Hypogymnia imshaugii, commonly known as the forked tube lichen, is a common species of foliose lichen in the family Parmeliaceae. It was formally described as a new species by Norwegian botanist Hildur Krog in 1968. It has a grey to gray-green thallus with slender lobes measuring up to 2 mm wide that are branched dichotomously at regular intervals. It has cup- to disc-shaped apothecia that are constricted at the base. The lichen grows on conifer branches, preferring inland habitats that are moderately dry.

References

imshaugii
Lichen species
Lichens of North America
Lichens described in 1968
Taxa named by Hildur Krog